The Committee of Presidents of Statistical Societies (COPSS) comprises the presidents, past presidents and presidents-elect of the following, primarily Northern American, professional societies of statisticians:
 American Statistical Association
 Institute of Mathematical Statistics
 Eastern North American Region of the International Biometric Society
 Western North American Region of the International Biometric Society
 Statistical Society of Canada

It also includes the president-elect-elect of Institute of Mathematical Statistics and the past-past-president of the Statistical Society of Canada.

COPSS is responsible for granting the following awards:
 The COPSS Presidents' Award for "an outstanding contribution to the profession of statistics" by a member of one of the constituent societies aged under 41
 The COPSS Distinguished Achievement Award and Lectureship for "achievement and scholarship in statistical science" that has made a "highly significant impact ... on scientific investigations"
 The Snedecor Award for "a noteworthy publication in biometry within three years of the data of the award"
 The Elizabeth L. Scott Award for "fostering opportunities in statistics for women"
 The Florence Nightingale David Award recognizes "a female statistician who serves as a role model to other women"

References

External links
 Committee of Presidents of Statistical Societies

Statistical organizations
Scientific organizations established in 1961
Scientific organizations based in North America